Vincenzo da Filicaja (30 December 164224 September 1707) was a Tuscan poet and politician. His poetry was compared to that of Petrarch, and his association with the Accademia della Crusca gave him access to royal patronage. He served as governor of Volterra and Pisa, successively, and finally in the Tuscan Senate.

Biography 
Vincenzo da Filicaja was born in Florence to a prominent aristocratic family. From an incidental notice in one of his letters, stating the amount of house rent paid during his childhood, his parents must have been in easy circumstances, and the supposition is confirmed by the fact that he enjoyed all the advantages of a liberal education, first under the Jesuits of Florence, and then in the University of Pisa. At Pisa he studied law.

After a five years in Pisa he returned to Florence, where he married Anna, daughter of the senator and marquis Scipione Capponi, and withdrew to a small villa at "Al Filicaja" (he always referred to Al Filicaja with the former name of "Figline"), not far from the city. Abjuring the thought of writing amatory poetry due the premature death of a young lady to whom he had been attached, he occupied himself chiefly with literary pursuits, above all the composition of Italian and Latin poetry. He was a member of the celebrated Accademia della Crusca and had good relations with the patrons of the Capponi family. At this academy he befriended Lorenzo Magalotti, Benedetto Menzini, Gori and Francesco Redi. The latter, author of Bacchus in Tuscany, was influential in gaining Filicaja access to court patronage.

Filicaja's rural seclusion was due to his limited means than to his rural tastes. But his poetical genius was fired by the deliverance of Vienna from the Turks in 1683, and helped by Redi, who not only laid Filicaja's verses before his own sovereign, but had them transmitted with the least possible delay to the foreign princes whose noble deeds were praised. The first recompense came, however, not from those princes, but from Christina, the ex-queen of Sweden, who, from her circle of savants and courtiers at Rome, spontaneously and generously announced to Filicaja her wish to bear the expense of educating his two sons, enhancing her kindness by the delicate request that it should remain a secret.

Filicaja's fortunes now improved. The grand-duke of Tuscany, Cosimo III, conferred on him an important office, the commissionership of official balloting. He was named governor of Volterra in 1696, where he strenuously exerted himself to improve public morality. Both there and at Pisa, where he was subsequently governor in 1700, his popularity was so great that on his removal the inhabitants of both cities petitioned for his recall. He passed the close of his life at Florence; the grandduke raised him to the rank of senator, and he died in that city. He was buried in the family vault in the church of San Pietro in Florence, and a monument was erected to his memory by his sole surviving son Scipione Filicaja.

Assessment
According to the Encyclopædia Britannica Eleventh Edition:

See also
Filicaja
House of Filicaja

References

Elogi degli uomini illustri toscani. Volume III, by Marco Lastri (1774) pages 575-579.

1642 births
1707 deaths
Writers from Florence
Italian poets
17th-century Italian poets
Italian male poets